The 2022 Brussels summit was a meeting of the heads of state and heads of government of NATO held in Brussels, Belgium, on 24 March 2022. The meeting took place in the wake of the 2022 Russian invasion of Ukraine.

On the day, NATO hosted meetings of G7 leaders. Ukraine President Volodymyr Zelenskyy attended by video conference and addressed the summit. Zelenskyy requested NATO states provide Ukraine with military equipment including aircraft, tanks, and armoured vehicles. He also called for NATO to establish a no-fly zone to prevent air and missile attacks in Ukraine. At the summit, some NATO states pledged to increase military spending.

At the summit, leaders also agreed to extend the term of Secretary General Jens Stoltenberg for another year until September 2023.

Following the summit, the leaders released a joint statement condemning Russian attacks on civilians and calling on Russia to immediately suspend military operations in Ukraine as had been ordered by the International Court of Justice a week earlier.

Member states leaders and other dignitaries in attendance

References 

2022 conferences
2022 in Brussels
2022 in international relations
21st-century diplomatic conferences (NATO)
Belgium and NATO
Diplomatic conferences in Belgium
March 2022 events in Europe
NATO summits
March 2022 events in Belgium